Sangsar (lit:Stone To Death), is a Pakistani drama serial which was first aired on 3 April 2017 on Hum TV preceding Gila. The drama is directed by Kamran Akbar Khan and written by Nuzhat Saman. It is produced by Momina Duraid under MD Productions.

Plot 
Ahmer is a business man and Roshni is a young graduate who belongs to middle-class family. Both love each other. Ahmer's mother Nadra is landlord of her house who takes advises from Muslim scholar for family matters. Ahmer's father Fayyaz is a patient who always keeps himself busy in studies and is often depressed because of his past. Ahmer also have a brother Ashar and sister Mehwish who is social and short-tempered.
Roshni is living with her father, her brother, Aneeq and his ill-tempered and social wife, Samira. Her mother died after giving birth to Roshni. She is the one who takes care of her father. Ahmer told her mother about Roshni but she initially refused. After consulting Muslim scholar, she agreed. Ashar also started liking roshni but is unaware that his brother is going to marry her as he left abroad for studies. The day Ahmer and Roshni married and the moment roshni entered his house, Nadra's maternal uncle died and she blamed on Roshni for being unlucky. Ahmer considered her mother to be sad that's why nothing happened. One day, Aneeq and Samira came to Ahmer's house to see Roshni and Samira told Nadra falsely about family matters because of roshni so that is why Roshni is not accepted by Nadra and Ahmer doesn't know as Roshni remains silent. Later, Ashar returns from abroad and is shocked to she roshni in his house but respects her. One day, Nadra was telling her friend that Roshni is having an affair with Ashar and Roshni overhears this and angrily goes to her room and cries. Ahmer asks her what happened but she moved Ahmer out of the room. Few moments later, Ahmer have an accident and he dies. After a few days Ashar married a meaningless woman who cares about herself (Mahreen). When Mahwish wants to marry Addan, she grabs Mahreen's stuff and Ashars credit card and left one of the jewelry in Roshni's room, but she told he truth to Nadra and then she pushed her to the bed really hard and Roshni was covered with blood Ahsar's father died  and then Nadra realises when mahreen pushed Nadra of the stairs . when mahwish court married with adnan, and escapes mahreen finally got a divorced and Nadra decided to Roshni to Marry Ashar.

Cast 

 Kinza Hashmi as Roshni
 Afraz Rasool as Ahmer 
 Laila Wasti as Nadra
 Hammad Farooqui as Ashar
 Alizeh Tahir as Mehwish
 Yasir Ali Khan as Adnan, Mehwish's husband 
 Ali Tahir as Fayyaz 
 Naeem Tahir as Roshni's father 
 Hassan Noman as Aneeq
 Sarah Baloch as Samira 
 Faheem Tijani
 Rehana Akhtar as Mehreen, Ashar's Divorced  wife
 Sofia Khan
 Najiba Faiz as Neelum

References 

Pakistani drama television series
2017 Pakistani television series debuts
2017 Pakistani television series endings
Urdu-language television shows
Hum TV original programming